Dexter's Laboratory: The Hip-Hop Experiment is a compilation album that features songs by various hip hop artists inspired by the Cartoon Network animated television series Dexter's Laboratory. It was released on August 20, 2002, on CD through Kid Rhino and Atlantic Records and as a limited collector's edition green vinyl.

Promotion
In August 2002, Cartoon Network promoted the soundtrack by releasing three music videos from the original soundtrack. The first, "Back to the Lab" by Prince Paul, debuted on August 16 on Cartoon Network's Cartoon Cartoon Fridays block, which was entirely devoted to Dexter's Laboratory that night. Two more followed: "Dexter (What's His Name?)" by Coolio and "Secrets" by will.i.am. To further promote the soundtrack, an advertisement for it was shown before The Powerpuff Girls Movie during its theatrical run and on its home media releases. Ads for the album also appeared in commercials for Cartoon Network and in hip-hop magazines such as The Source and Urb. Promotions included Dexter's Laboratory trading cards, books, and Game Boy products.

Reception

The Hip Hop Experiment received universal acclaim from critics who reviewed the album. Heather Phares of AllMusic gave the album a positive review, stating that "its only drawback is that it's so short." Coolio, a fan of Dexter's Laboratory, was more than happy to make a song for the soundtrack, stating, "They called me to do a song for Dexter's Laboratory and I didn't really know what I wanted to do at first, but I knew I wanted it to be positive and lively." He then said when it came time for recording he thought it was important to consult the opinions of certain people first: "I had my children in the studio with me. They watch Dexter's Laboratory and they represent the audience for the show, so it made sense to ask them for their opinions. I played them a demo of the songs and they told me what they thought."

Track listing

Album

7'' Green Vinyl Single
A side

B side

References

External links
 

Dexter's Laboratory
2002 soundtrack albums
Cartoon Network albums
Warner Records compilation albums
Atlantic Records albums
Hip hop soundtracks
Hip hop compilation albums